St Mary's is a small Gothic Revival Anglican church located in Carrigaline, County Cork, Ireland. It was completed in 1824. It is dedicated to Mary, mother of Jesus. It is part of the Diocese of Cork, Cloyne, and Ross.

History 
St Mary's church is built on site of an earlier church dating to 1723. It was completed between 1823 and 1824, with the northern transept added in 1835 by William Hill, then the diocesan architect. In 1893 the pews were replaced by William Henry Hill, who also panelled the chancel and added a window to the wall of the southern nave.

Architecture 
The church is built in the Gothic Revival style. The church contains an octagonal limestone font dating from 1637. The churchyard features two mausolea to members of the Newenham family, resident of nearby Coolmore House.

References

Notes

Sources 

 

Architecture in Ireland
Churches in the Diocese of Cork, Cloyne and Ross
19th-century Church of Ireland church buildings
Gothic Revival church buildings in the Republic of Ireland
19th-century churches in the Republic of Ireland